Ravenspurn was a town in the East Riding of Yorkshire, England, which was lost due to coastal erosion, one of more than 30 along the Holderness Coast which have been lost to the North Sea since the 19th century. The town was located close to the end of a peninsula near Ravenser Odd, which has also been flooded.  The peninsula still survives and is known as Spurn Head.  The North Sea lies to the east of the peninsula, the river Humber to the west.

The nearest major city was Kingston upon Hull.

The region of coastline is known as the Holderness Coast; geologically the land is formed of glacial tills (boulder clay), which are subject to coastal erosion. Now at sea, areas around the site are being drilled for natural gas.

Ravenspurn appears in William Shakespeare's plays Richard II, Henry IV, Part 1, and Henry VI, Part 3, under the spelling "Ravenspurgh".

Two medieval English kings landed at Ravenspurn: Henry IV in 1399, on his way to dethrone Richard II, and Edward IV in 1471, on his way back from exile in the Netherlands, where he was resisted by the local lord, Sir Martin de la See.

See also

 Ravenser Odd
Ravenspurn gas fields

References

External links
 
 

Coastal erosion in the United Kingdom
Holderness
Lost villages and towns of the East Riding of Yorkshire
Underwater ruins